The Minister of Defence and Military Veterans (formerly the Minister of Defence) is a Minister in the Government of South Africa, who is responsible for overseeing the Department of Defence, the Department of Military Veterans and the South African National Defence Force.

List of ministers

Minister of Defence, 1910–2013

Minister of Defence and Military Veterans, 2013–present

References

Defence